Raymond Owen "Ray" Ruffels (born 23 March 1946) is an Australian former professional tennis player and coach.

Playing career
Ruffels was an Australian Open semi-finalist in 1968, 1969 and 1975, and a quarter-finalist in 1970 and 1977. In 1978, partnering with Billie Jean King in mixed doubles competition, Ruffels reached the final at Wimbledon and the US Open.

He was a member of the Australian Davis Cup team in 1968, 1969, 1970, and 1977.

Career finals

Doubles (16 titles, 7 runner-ups)

Coaching career
Ruffels was appointed the inaugural Head Coach of the Australian Institute of Sport (AIS) tennis program in 1981. He held this position until his retirement in January 1990. Whilst at the AIS, Ruffels coached many young players that would have successful professional careers including: Pat Cash, Wally Masur, Darren Cahill, Todd Woodbridge, Richard Fromberg, Simon Youl and Johan Anderson. After leaving the AIS, he coached Todd Woodbridge and Mark Woodforde, who as a doubles team won many major titles including the gold medal at the 1996 Atlanta Olympics.

In 2009, he returned to Australia to work at the AIS after being a national coach for the United States Tennis Association player development program in California.

In November 2016, he was awarded The President's Spirit of Tennis by Tennis Australia.

Personal
Ruffels married professional tennis player Anna-Maria Fernandez and they have two children, Ryan and Gabriela; both have taken up golf as a career.

References

External links
 
 
 
 

Australian male tennis players
Australian Open (tennis) champions
Tennis players from Sydney
1946 births
Living people
Grand Slam (tennis) champions in men's doubles
Australian Institute of Sport coaches
Australian tennis coaches